The Royal New Zealand Navy (RNZN) is the maritime arm of the New Zealand Defence Force. The fleet currently consists of nine ships. The Navy had its origins in the Naval Defence Act 1913, and the subsequent purchase of the cruiser , which by 1921 had been moored in Auckland as a training ship. A slow buildup occurred during the Interwar period, and then perhaps the infant Navy's finest hour occurred soon after the beginning of World War II when  fought alongside two other Royal Navy cruisers at the Battle of the River Plate in December 1939.

History

Pre–World War I

The first recorded maritime combat activity in New Zealand occurred when Māori in war waka attacked Dutch explorer Abel Tasman off the northern tip of the South Island in December 1642.

The New Zealand Navy did not exist as a separate military force until 1941. The association of the Royal Navy with New Zealand began with the arrival of Lieutenant (later Captain) James Cook in 1769, who completed two subsequent journeys to New Zealand in 1773 and 1777. Occasional visits by Royal Navy ships were made from the late 18th century until the signing of the Treaty of Waitangi in 1840. William Hobson, a crucial player in the drafting of the treaty, was in New Zealand as a captain in the Royal Navy. The signing of the Treaty of Waitangi made New Zealand a colony in the British Empire, so the defence of the coastline became the responsibility of the Royal Navy. That role was fulfilled until World War I, and the Royal Navy also played a part in the New Zealand Wars: for example, a gunboat shelled fortified Māori pā from the Waikato River in order to defeat the Māori King Movement.

World War I and the inter-war period
In 1909, the New Zealand government decided to fund the purchase of the battlecruiser  for the Royal Navy, which saw action throughout World War I in Europe. The passing of the Naval Defence Act 1913 created the New Zealand Naval Forces, still as a part of the Royal Navy. The first purchase by the New Zealand government for the New Zealand Naval Forces was the cruiser , which escorted New Zealand land forces to occupy the German colony of Samoa in 1914. Philomel saw further action under the command of the Royal Navy in the Mediterranean, the Red Sea, and the Persian Gulf. By 1917, she was worn out and was sent back to New Zealand where she served as a depot ship in Wellington Harbour for minesweepers. In 1921 she was transferred to Auckland for use as a training ship.

The New Zealand Naval Forces passed to the control of Commander-in-Chief, China, after the Royal Navy forces in Australia came under Canberra's control in 1911. From 1921 to 1941 the force was known as the New Zealand Division of the Royal Navy. The cruiser Chatham along with the sloop Veronica arrived in 1920, Philomel was transferred to the Division in 1921, as was the sloop Torch,  arrived in 1922 and then  in 1924.  and the minesweeper HMS Wakakura arrived in 1926. Between World War I and World War II, the New Zealand Division operated a total of 14 ships, including the cruisers HMS Achilles (joined 31 March 1937) and HMS Leander, which replaced Diomede and Dunedin (replaced by Leander in 1937).

World War II

When Britain went to war against Germany in 1939, New Zealand officially declared war at the same time, backdated to 9.30 pm on 3 September local time. But the gathering in Parliament in Carl Berendsen's room (including Peter Fraser) could not follow Chamberlain's words because of static on the shortwave and waited until the Admiralty notified the fleet that war had broken out before Cabinet approved the declaration of war (the official telegram from Britain was delayed and arrived just before midnight).

 participated in the first major naval battle of World War II, the Battle of the River Plate off the River Plate estuary between Argentina and Uruguay, in December 1939. The German Captain Hans Langsdorff then scuttled Graf Spee rather than face the loss of many more German seamen's lives. This decision apparently infuriated Hitler.

Achilles moved to the Pacific, and was working with the United States Navy (USN) when damaged by a Japanese bomb off New Georgia. Following repair, she served alongside the British Pacific Fleet until the war's end.

The New Zealand Division of the Royal Navy became the Royal New Zealand Navy (RNZN) from 1 October 1941, in recognition of the fact that the naval force was now largely self-sufficient and independent of the Royal Navy. The Prime Minister Peter Fraser reluctantly agreed, though saying "now was not the time to break away from the old country". Ships thereafter were prefixed HMNZS (His/Her Majesty's New Zealand Ship).

 escorted the New Zealand Expeditionary Force to the Middle East in 1940 and was then deployed in the Mediterranean, the Red Sea, and the Indian Ocean. Leander was subjected to air and naval attack from Axis forces, conducted bombardments, and escorted convoys. In February 1941, Leander sank the Italian auxiliary cruiser  in the Indian Ocean. In 1943, after serving further time in the Mediterranean, Leander returned to the Pacific Ocean. The extent of the damage to Leander saw her docked for repairs until the end of the war.

As the war progressed, the size of the RNZN greatly increased, and by the end of the war, there were over 60 ships in commission. These ships participated as part of the British and Commonwealth effort against the Axis in Europe, and against the Japanese in the Pacific. They also played an important role in the defence of New Zealand, from German raiders, especially when the threat of invasion from Japan appeared imminent in 1942. Many merchant ships were requisitioned and armed for help in defence. In 1941–1942, it was decided in an agreement between the New Zealand and United States governments that the best role for the RNZN in the Pacific was as part of the United States Navy, so operational control of the RNZN was transferred to the South West Pacific Area command, and its ships joined United States 7th Fleet taskforces.

In 1943, the light cruiser  was transferred to the RNZN as HMNZS Gambia. In November 1944, the British Pacific Fleet, a joint British Commonwealth military formation, was formed, based in Sydney, Australia. Most RNZN ships were transferred to the BPF, including Gambia and Achilles. They took part in the Battle of Okinawa and operations in the Sakishima Islands, near Japan. In August 1945, HMNZS Gambia was New Zealand's representative at the surrender of Japan.

Post-World War II

During April 1947 a series of non-violent mutinies occurred amongst the sailors and non-commissioned officers of four RNZN ships and two shore bases. Overall, up to 20% of the sailors in the RNZN were involved in the mutinies. The resulting manpower shortage forced the RNZN to remove the light cruiser , one of their most powerful warships, from service and set the navy's development and expansion back by a decade. Despite this impact, the size and scope of the events have been downplayed over time.

RNZN ships participated in the Korean War.

On 3 July, these two first ships left Devonport Naval Base, Auckland and joined other Commonwealth forces at Sasebo, Japan, on 2 August. These vessels served under the command of a British flag officer (seemingly Flag Officer Second in Command Far East Fleet) and formed part of the US Navy screening force during the Battle of Inchon, performing shore raids and inland bombardment. Only one RNZN sailor was killed during the conflict – during the Inchon bombardments.

The Navy later participated in the Malayan Emergency. In 1954 a New Zealand frigate, HMNZS Pukaki, carried out a bombardment of a suspected guerilla camp, while operating with the Royal Navy's Far East Fleet – the first of a number of bombardments by RNZN ships over the next five years. Jack Welch, later to become Chief of Naval Staff decades later, wrote that in 1959, the RNZN "was still very much part of the Royal Navy supported by New Zealand tax-payers. The officer corps and senior specialist ratings were very dependent on loan and exchange RN personnel, while our own [New Zealand] officers and senior ratings were almost exclusively trained in the UK. We simply borrowed the RN's administrative regulations and amended them to local conditions. The Empire was alive and well. Operationally we were still very strongly tied to the UK."

Later the Navy return to Malayan waters during the Indonesia-Malaysia confrontation. These operations were the RNZN's last large-scale operation with the Royal Navy. The commitment, wrote Welch, "involved the whole fleet, as ships rotated though Pearl Harbor for workup with the USN before deploying on to the Far East to relieve ships on station."

Until the 1960s, the RNZN had, in common with other Dominion navies, flown the White Ensign as a common ensign. After 1945, the foreign policies of the now-independent states had become more distinctive. There was a growing wish and a need for separate identities, particularly if one Dominion was engaged in hostilities where another was not. Thus, in 1968, the RNZN adopted its own ensign, which retained the Union Flag in a top quarter but replaces the St George's Cross with the Southern Cross constellation that is displayed on the national flag.

Since 1946, the Navy has policed New Zealand's territorial waters and exclusive economic zone for fisheries protection. It also aids New Zealand's scientific activities in Antarctica, at Scott Base.

The frigates were sent into the potential blast zone of the weapons, where both ships witnessed one airburst test each which forced France to then change to underground testing.

In May 1982 Prime Minister Rob Muldoon seconded the frigate Canterbury to the Royal Navy for the duration of the Falklands War. Canterbury was deployed to the Armilla Patrol in the Persian Gulf, to relieve a British frigate for duty in the South Atlantic.

Post-Cold War

At the close of the Cold War the RNZN operated a surface combatant force of four frigates (HMNZS Waikato (F55), HMNZS Wellington (F69), HMNZS Canterbury (F421), and HMNZS Southland). Due to the post-Cold War restructuring of the RNZN the frigate fleet was downsized to two frigates, although there was considerable political debate at times during the mid-1990s about whether a third and fourth Anzac-class frigate should be procured.

In the past three decades, the RNZN has operated in the Middle East a number of times. RNZN ships played a role in the Iran–Iraq War, aiding the Royal Navy in protecting neutral shipping in the Indian Ocean. Frigates were also sent to participate in the first Gulf War, and more recently Operation Enduring Freedom. The RNZN has played an important part in conflicts in the Pacific as well. Naval forces were utilised in the Bougainville, Solomon Islands and East Timor conflicts of the 1990s. The RNZN often participates in United Nations peacekeeping operations.

Resolution was used to survey and chart the sea around New Zealand and the Pacific Islands. A small motor boat, SMB Adventure, was operated from Resolution. Resolution carried some of the most advanced survey technology available. HMNZS Resolution was decommissioned at Devonport Naval Base on 27 April 2012.

Ships and aircraft

Current

Combat Force

The Combat Force consists of two Anzac-class frigates: HMNZS Te Kaha and HMNZS Te Mana. Initially, two more frigates were planned, but this was cancelled due to the political pressure surrounding defence expenditure following the New Zealand breakup of military relations with ANZUS. Both ships are based at the Devonport Naval Base in Auckland. HMNZS Te Kaha was commissioned on 26 July 1997 and HMNZS Te Mana on 10 December 1999. The specifications and armaments of the two ships are identical. Both ships completed refits in 2020 and 2022 respectively.

Patrol Force

The Patrol Force consists of two offshore and two inshore patrol vessels. The Patrol Force is responsible for policing New Zealand's Exclusive Economic Zone, one of the largest in the world. In addition, the Patrol Force provides assistance to a range of civilian government agencies, including the Department of Conservation, New Zealand Customs and Police, Ministry of Fisheries and others. The Patrol Force consists of:
 2 s ( and )
 2 s ( and )

Support Force
 , a multi-role vessel that entered service in June 2007.
 , a dive and hydrographic vessel commissioned in 2019.
 , a replenishment oiler commissioned in 2020.

Aviation

The Royal New Zealand Air Force operates eight Kaman SH-2G Super Seasprite helicopters. These eight aircraft are part of No. 6 Squadron. The squadron is based at RNZAF Base Auckland, and helicopters are assigned to the ships as they are sent on deployments across the globe. The roles of the helicopters include:
 surface warfare missions and surveillance operations
 underwater warfare
 helicopter delivery services/logistics
 search and rescue
 medical evacuation
 training
 assistance to other Government agencies

Non-commissioned vessels 
A number of non-commissioned auxiliary vessels are used for a number or littoral, support and training purposes.

 3 Chico 40 sail training yachts (Manga II, Mako II, Paea II)
 2 Landing Craft Mechanised landing craft (LC01, LC02) - Used aboard HMNZS Canterbury.
 2 Rapid Environment Assessment motorboats (Takapu, Tarapunga)
 2 Surtees Workmate hydrographic and diving support launches (Pathfinder, Hammerhead)

Unmanned vehicles 

The RNZN operates a small number of unmanned surface and underwater vehicles.

 6 REMUS 100 autonomous underwater vehicles
 4 REMUS 300 autonomous underwater vehicles
 1 Martac Mantas T12 unmanned surface vehicle

The RNZN does not operate any ship-based unmanned aerial systems. However, according to a recent tender document, there exists some considerable scope for the acquisition of new systems.

Future

Hydrographics and diving
HMNZS Matataua (MAT) is a land-based unit (a stone frigate) formed in 2017 (it was previously the Littoral Warfare Unit) with two operational groups, one for military hydrographics and the other clearance diving, and a logistics support group. It combines the former teams for mine counter measures, maritime survey and operational diving and operates four REMUS 100 Autonomous underwater vehicles.  MAT is responsible for ensuring access to and the use of harbours, inshore waters and associated coastal zones. The clearance diving group responsibilities include the disposal of explosive ordnance, beach reconnaissance in support of amphibious operations, underwater engineering and underwater search and recovery in support of the NZ Police.

Role

Defence

In its Statement of Intent, the NZDF states its primary mission as:

"to secure New Zealand from external threat, to protect our sovereign interests, including in the Exclusive Economic Zone (EEZ) and to be able to take action to meet likely contingencies in our strategic area of interest."

The intermediate outcomes of the NZDF are listed as:
 Secure New Zealand, including its people, land, territorial waters, exclusive economic zone, natural resources and critical infrastructure.
 Reduced risks to New Zealand from regional and global insecurity.
 New Zealand values and interests advanced through participation in regional and international security systems.
 New Zealand is able to meet future national security challenges.

The role of the navy is to fulfil the maritime elements of the missions of the NZDF.

International participation
The RNZN has a role to help prevent any unrest occurring in New Zealand. This can be done by having a presence in overseas waters and assisting redevelopment in troubled countries. For example, any unrest in the Pacific Islands has the potential to affect New Zealand because of the large Pacific Island population. The stability of the South Pacific is considered in the interest of New Zealand. The navy has participated in peace-keeping and peace-making in
East Timor, Bougainville and the Solomon Islands, supporting land based operations.

Civilian roles

The 2002 Maritime Forces Review identified a number of roles that other government agencies required the RNZN to undertake. Approximately 1,400 days at sea are required to fulfil these roles annually.

Roles include patrolling the exclusive economic zone, transport to offshore islands, and support for the New Zealand Customs Service.

The RNZN formerly produced hydrographic information for Land Information New Zealand under a commercial contract arrangement, however with the decommissioning of the dedicated Hydrographic survey ship HMNZS Resolution this has lapsed and the Navy now focuses on military hydrography.

Current deployments

Since 2001, both Anzac-class frigates have participated in the United States' Operation Enduring Freedom in the Persian Gulf and have conducted maritime patrol operations in support of American and allied efforts in Afghanistan.

On 21 June 2006 Te Mana was in South East Asia, and Te Kaha was in New Zealand waters, to be deployed to South East Asia in the second half of 2006.

Personnel

On 30 June 2014 the RNZN consisted of 2,050 Regular Force personnel, 392 Naval Reserve personnel.

Reserves

Fleet Reserve

All regular force personnel on discharge from the RNZN are liable for service in the Royal New Zealand Navy Fleet Reserve. The Fleet reserve has an active and inactive list. RNZNVR personnel can choose to serve four years in the fleet reserve on discharge.

The RNZN has not published Fleet Reserve numbers since the early 1990s.

Volunteer Reserve

The primary reserve component of the RNZN is the Royal New Zealand Naval Volunteer Reserve (RNZNVR), which is organised into four units based in Auckland (with a satellite unit at Tauranga), Wellington, Christchurch, and Dunedin:
 HMNZS Ngapona: Naval Reserve, Auckland
 HMNZS Olphert: Naval Reserve, Wellington
 HMNZS Pegasus: Naval Reserve, Christchurch
 HMNZS Toroa: Naval Reserve, Dunedin

At present civilians can join the RNZNVR in one of three branches: Administration, Sea Service (for service on inshore patrol vessels), and Maritime Trade Organisation (formerly Naval Control of Shipping). In addition ex regular force personnel can now join the RNZNVR in their former branch, and depending on time out of the service, rank. The requirement to attend compulsory training one night a week has recently been removed.

Training
Naval Ratings begin an 18-week basic training course (Basic Common Training) prior to commencing their branch training (Basic Branch Training) which focuses on their chosen trade.

Naval Officers complete 22 weeks of training in three phases before commencing specialist training.

Finance

Routine funding

The RNZN is funded through a "vote" of the Parliament of New Zealand. The New Zealand Defence Force funds personnel, operating and finance costs. Funding is then allocated to specific "Output Classes", which are aligned to policy objectives.

Funding allocation in each Output Class includes consumables, personnel, depreciation and a 'Capital Charge'. The Capital Charge is a budgetary mechanism to reflect the cost of Crown capital and was set at 7.5% for the 2009/2010 year.

Large projects

The Ministry of Defence is responsible for the acquisition of significant items of military equipment needed to meet New Zealand Defence Force capability requirements. Funding for the Ministry of Defence is appropriated separately.

Onshore establishments

The Navy Museum

The Navy Museum of the Royal New Zealand Navy is located at 64 King Edward Parade, Devonport, Auckland, New Zealand
 and contains important collections of naval artefacts, and extensive records.

Naval Communications Facility Irirangi
HMNZS Irirangi was a Naval Communication Station at Waiouru from 1943 to 1993.

Uniforms and insignia
Uniforms of the RNZN are very similar to those of the British Royal Navy and other Commonwealth of Nations navies. However, RNZN personnel wear the nationality marker "NEW ZEALAND" on a curved shoulder flash on the service uniform and embroidered on shoulder slip-ons. Also, the RNZN uses the rank of Ensign as its lowest commissioned rank.

Rank structure and insignia

See also
 Military history of New Zealand
 New Zealand Sea Cadet Corps
 New Zealand military ranks
 New Zealand Defence College
 Logistics ships of the Royal New Zealand Navy
 List of individual weapons of the New Zealand armed forces
 List of ships of the Royal New Zealand Navy

References

Further reading
 Defence of New Zealand Study Group, Ramparts on the Sea.
 Howard, Grant. The Navy in New Zealand: An Illustrated History, AH & AW Reed, 1981.
 
 
 Commodore J O'C Ross, The White Ensign in New Zealand
 Rear-Admiral Jack Welch, "New Zealand's navy seeks 'credible minimum'", International Defence Review 9/1995, Vol. 28, No. 9, pages 75–77.

External links

 
 Royal New Zealand Naval Association website
 The Royal New Zealand Navy in World War II, Official History (online), by S D Waters
 The First New Zealand Navy in the Maori Wars (Appendix to WWII History above)
 Now-HMNZS Matataua
 https://rnzncomms.org/books/ - Books written by Sailors

 
1941 establishments in New Zealand
Organizations established in 1941
New Zealand Defence Force
Organisations based in New Zealand with royal patronage